İhsan Poyraz  (born 5 March 1988) is an Austrian retired football player. He also has Turkish citizenship.

References

External links
 Guardian football

1988 births
Living people
Footballers from Vienna
Turkish footballers
Austrian people of Turkish descent
Austrian footballers
Austria youth international footballers
Association football goalkeepers
SV Wienerberger players
Manisaspor footballers
TFF First League players